Butterfly Recordings is the name used by three record labels.

1970s
"Butterfly Records", a disco record label created in 1977 by A.J. Cervantes in Los Angeles, California. Throughout the 1980s, the company licensed its music for movies, television and aerobics studios.  The catalog was sold to Warner Music in 1988.  Per A.J. Cervantes.

1990s
"Butterfly Recordings", formed by the artist and electronic dance music producer Martin Glover (commonly known as Youth). Youth set up the second incarnation in the 1990s before setting up Dragonfly Records. It released many electronic dance albums by such bands as System 7, often in conjunction with Big Life. It is sometimes cited as Butterfly Records.

2007
Youth and Simon Tong formed the third incarnation to focus on folk and acoustic music. The label's first release is What the Folk (12 February 2007).

See also 
 List of record labels
 List of electronic music record labels
 List of independent UK record labels

References

External links
 Butterfly Recordings — official site
 Article about Youth, Simon Tong, Butterfly Recordings and indigo Moss - The Guardian - 2 February 2007.

American record labels
British record labels
Record labels established in 2007
English electronic dance music record labels
Pop record labels
Folk record labels